Boys Will Be Boyz is the third studio album by Christian pop rock band Newsboys, released in 1991.

Track listing

Music Videos
"Kingdom Man"
"One Heart"
"Taste and See" (Remix)

Radio singles
"One Heart"
"Kingdom Man"
"Stay With Me"
"Israel"
"You and Me"

Boys Will Be Boyz (video)
Boys Will Be Boyz is a live video by Newsboys, released in 1991. It is Newsboys' first live video, and features songs from their then-new third album Boys Will Be Boyz. It also included a bonus video of Simple Man from Hell Is for Wimps. It was available in NTSC, HiFi Sound, and VHS. It is now out of print. Besides the concert video, there is also a behind-the-scenes part.

Track listing
 "One Heart"
 "Kingdom Man"
 "Taste and See (Remix)"
 "Simple Man"
 "Other Fun Stuff"

Personnel 
Newsboys
 John James – lead vocals
 Peter Furler – drums, vocals, arrangements (1-4, 7, 8, 10)
 Corey Pryor – keyboards
 Sean Taylor – bass guitar, vocals
 Vernon Bishop – guitars, vocals

Additional Musicians
 Tony Miceli – Synclavier programming (5, 6, 9, 11), arrangements (5, 6, 9, 11), backing vocals 
 Kaz – backing vocals

Heirborn Choir (Track 5)
 Carol Becker
 Terry L. Clark 
 Preston Greene
 Ladye Love Smith
 Rod Lyon
 Sarah Moore
 Kathy Smith
 Danny Whipple
 Nancy Whipple

Production
 Peter Furler – producer 
 Tony Miceli – producer (5, 6, 9, 11), engineer (5, 6, 9, 11)
 Dez Dickerson – executive producer, mixing (1, 2, 4, 7, 10)
 Rob Merlini – engineer (1-4, 7, 8, 10), mixing (3, 8)
 Salvatore "Plinky" Giglio – mixing (1, 2, 4, 7, 10)
 Anthony DeRosa – assistant engineer 
 Wes Campbell – production engineer
 Denny Purcell – mastering 
 Georgetown Masters (Nashville, Tennessee, USA) – mastering location 
 Toni Thigpen – creative director 
 Thanh Tam Nguyen – design 
 Steve Lyons – photography

References 

1991 albums
Newsboys albums